Majid Gharizadeh is an Iranian filmmaker. He won the Crystal Simorgh for writing the script of his directorial debut The Grandfather (1985). Other films include:

 Good friends (2015)
 Brick Boys (2006)
 Youth (1998)
 Today's Woman (1996)
 Restless (1373)
 Shaghayegh (1991)
 My daughter Sahar (1989)
 Land of Wishes (1987)

References

Iranian directors
Year of birth missing (living people)
Living people
Crystal Simorgh for Best Screenplay winners
Place of birth missing (living people)